Lyndra S. Littles (born June 20, 1987) is an American basketball player.

She was drafted by the Connecticut Sun but waived before the 2009 WNBA season began. She was signed to a training camp contract by the Indiana Fever in 2010, but did not play for the team.

Virginia  statistics
Source

References

External links
WNBA Player Profile
Virginia Cavaliers bio

1987 births
Living people
American women's basketball players
Basketball players from Washington, D.C.
Forwards (basketball)
Connecticut Sun draft picks
Virginia Cavaliers women's basketball players
Archbishop Carroll High School (Washington, D.C.) alumni